John Ottaway is an English international lawn bowler born on 2 June 1955.

Bowls career
John began bowling in 1970 aged just 15 and played indoors and outdoors for Wymondham Dell club in Norfolk.

He represented England in the fours, at the 1990 Commonwealth Games in Auckland, New Zealand and the fours at the 1998 Commonwealth Games in Kuala Lumpur, Malaysia.

His greatest moment came when winning the Gold Medal at the 2002 Commonwealth Games in the Men's fours at the 2002 Commonwealth Games. John became Norfolk bowls president in 2014.

He has won five National Championship titles in 1989, 1990, 1996, 2000 and 2001 and won the singles at the British Isles Bowls Championships in 1990.

References 

English male bowls players
1955 births
Living people
People from Wymondham
Commonwealth Games medallists in lawn bowls
Commonwealth Games gold medallists for England
Bowls players at the 1990 Commonwealth Games
Bowls players at the 1998 Commonwealth Games
Bowls players at the 2002 Commonwealth Games
Medallists at the 2002 Commonwealth Games